Juan de Zúñiga Flores (died 20 December 1602) was Bishop of Cartagena from 24 January 1600 until his death, and Grand Inquisitor of Spain from 29 July 1602 until his death.

References
Appendix 2 to Henry Charles Lea's A History of the Inquisition of Spain

External links and additional sources
 (for Chronology of Bishops) 
 (for Chronology of Bishops) 

Bishops of Cartagena
1602 deaths
Grand Inquisitors of Spain
17th-century Roman Catholic bishops in Spain
Year of birth unknown